is a railway station on the Hisatsu Line in Ebino, Miyazaki, Japan, operated by Kyushu Railway Company (JR Kyushu). The station opened in 1911.

Lines
Masaki Station is served by the Hisatsu Line.

Adjacent stations

Gallery

See also
 List of railway stations in Japan

References

External links
 
  

Railway stations in Japan opened in 1911
Railway stations in Miyazaki Prefecture